The  is an autobahn in Germany and connects the A 67 and the A 5 with Darmstadt. With a length of a little less than 2 km, it is one of the shortest Autobahns.

Exit list 

  
 Road continues as the B 26 into Darmstadt 
|}

External links 

672
A672